Club de Deportes Malleco Unido is a Chilean football club from Angol, Chile. The club was founded on March 25, 1974 and currently play in the Chilean Segunda División, the third tier of the Chilean football league system.

The club has 1 official title, the Copa CCU of Closing Tournament 1985-86 of the Segunda División of Chile. In 2009, he returned to the amateurism after 35 years. However, in 2012, was accepted by the ANFA to participate in the Tercera B, a competition in which was runner up and amounted to Tercera División. In 2013 and after several efforts, is accepted by the ANFP to play in the Segunda División of Chile.

His rival traditional is Deportes Iberia.

Titles
Closing Tournament-Copa CCU: 1
1985-86

Seasons
15 seasons in Primera B
4 seasons in Segunda División
19 seasons in Tercera División
1 season in Tercera B
3 seasons in Asociación de origen

Current squad

See also
Chilean football league system

External links

Football clubs in Chile
Association football clubs established in 1974
1974 establishments in Chile